Felicia Gayle Picus (known as Lisha) was a St. Louis Post-Dispatch reporter who was found stabbed to death in her St. Louis, Missouri home.

Murder
Gayle, 42 years old at the time, was murdered during a burglary in her gated community home in the University City suburb of St Louis, Missouri, on August 11, 1998. She was stabbed between 10 times and 43 times with a butcher's knife.

Investigation and trial
Police arrested Marcellus Williams (born December 30, 1968) for the crime based on a jailhouse confession to fellow inmate Henry Cole, and testimony of his former girlfriend Lara Asaro for which $10000 was paid. No physical evidence connects Williams to the murder, although the police found some of Gayle's possessions, including her husband's laptop, in the car Williams drove that day. In December, DNA testing results cast fresh doubt on the conviction. On August 15, 2017, the Supreme Court of Missouri summarily denied him a new execution stay, despite recently obtained results of that testing that support his innocence claim.

Williams was sentenced to death on August 27, 2001, by St. Louis County Circuit Judge Emmett M. O’Brien. He is held at Potosi Correctional Center and was scheduled to be executed by lethal injection on August 22, 2017. A last minute stay of execution was issued by Governor Eric Greitens and a Board of Inquiry was initiated.  The Board is headed by Carol E. Jackson and consists of 5 retired judges. It has subpoenaed both prosecution and defense.  The Board had hearings in August 2018, and Governor Mike Parson will receive the Board's conclusion, and make his decision. As of September 2021 the Board were still looking into new findings.

See also
 List of death row inmates in the United States

References

1998 murders in the United States
1998 in Missouri
American murder victims
August 1998 events in the United States
Deaths by person in Missouri
Deaths by stabbing in Missouri
People murdered in Missouri